Henry Pelham "Hal" Cazalet (born 16 September 1969) is a British tenor opera singer.

Early life
Cazalet is the son of Sir Edward Cazalet, a retired High Court judge, and his wife, the Honourable Camilla Jane Gage, daughter of Henry Gage, 6th Viscount Gage. His paternal grandfather was Major Peter Cazalet, the well-known racehorse trainer.

He has an older brother, David Benedict Cazalet and a younger sister, the actress Lara Cazalet, with whom Cazalet sings professionally in a jazz trio.

Education

Cazalet attended the Dragon School in Oxford, England and Bryanston School in Dorset. Later he trained at the Guildhall School of Music in London and the Juilliard Opera Center, where he won the Shoshana Foundation Award.

Career
In the course of his career, Cazalet has appeared at almost all of the major operatic venues. His roles include Nicholas in Death and the Powers at the Monte Carlo Opera, Gerard in Les Enfants Terribles by Philip Glass’  at the Brooklyn Academy of Music Opera House, and Charles in The Music Programme at the Royal Opera House. His Lincoln Center concert debut was a performance of L'Infinito by Tristan Keuris. He has also performed with the New York Festival of Song at Weill Hall, at Carnegie Hall, and at the Wigmore Hall in London. He also performed as Mr Angel in The Impresario with the National Symphony Orchestra under Christopher Hogwood at the Kennedy Center. Other performances include Cascada in The Merry Widow with the English National Opera and Albert in Albert Herring with the Glyndebourne Touring Opera.

Ancestry

References 

1969 births
Living people
People educated at The Dragon School
Alumni of the Guildhall School of Music and Drama
Juilliard School alumni
English opera singers
English tenors
Hal